Donald Robert Ingalls (January 17, 1919 – April 8, 1970) was an American football player and coach.  He played college football at the University of Michigan and was chosen by conference coaches as a second-team player on the Associated Press All-Big Ten Conference team in 1940. He was drafted by the Green Bay Packers in the 18th round of the 1942 NFL Draft and played professionally in the National Football League (NFL) for the Packers for one season, in 1942.  Ingalls served as an assistant football coach at Nebraska in the 1940s.  He served as the head football coach at the University of Connecticut from 1952 to 1963, compiling a record of 49–54–3.  He died on April 8, 1970 at Windham Community Hospital in Willimantic, Connecticut.

Head coaching record

References

External links
 
 

1919 births
1970 deaths
American football centers
UConn Huskies football coaches
Green Bay Packers players
Kansas Jayhawks football coaches
Michigan Wolverines football players
Navy Midshipmen football coaches
Nebraska Cornhuskers football coaches
Marblehead High School alumni
People from Marblehead, Massachusetts
Sportspeople from Essex County, Massachusetts
Coaches of American football from Massachusetts
Players of American football from Massachusetts